This is the complete list of women's Olympic medalists in cycling.

Current events

BMX

Freestyle

Racing
The BMX was introduced in 2008.

Mountain biking

Cross-country
The cross-country has been on the Olympic program from 1996 on.

Road cycling

Road race
The individual road race has been run every time since 1984.

Time trial
The individual time trial was introduced in 1996, and has been run ever since.

Track cycling

Keirin

Madison

Omnium

Pursuit, team

Sprint, individual
The individual sprint was first contested in the Olympics in 1988 and has been so ever since.

Sprint, team

Discontinued events

Track cycling

Points race
The points race was on the program from 1996 until 2008.

Pursuit, Individual
The individual pursuit over 3000 m was first done in 1992 until 2008.

Time trial
The 500 m time trial was only used in the 2000 and 2004 Olympics.

All-time medal table (women's) 1984–Present

References

Cycling (women)
List of medalists (women)
Olympic
 
Olympic medallists